The Concert Artistes Association is a UK theatre artists benevolent association founded in 1897. Presidents of the association included Arthur Askey, Thorpe Bates, Elsie and Doris Waters, Norman Long, husband and wife act Nan Kenway and Douglas Young, and Suzette Tarri.

Association headquarters are in London.

References

External links
 Official website

Entertainment industry unions
1897 establishments in the United Kingdom
Trade unions established in 1897